Platter is an unincorporated community in Bryan County, Oklahoma, United States. Platter has a post office with the ZIP code 74753. The town was named after an A.F. Platter, who was a businessman from Denison, Texas.

Demographics

References

 

Unincorporated communities in Bryan County, Oklahoma
Unincorporated communities in Oklahoma